The 2011–12 Swazi Premier League season was the 2011–12 season of the top level of  football competition in Swaziland.

Standings

References

Football leagues in Eswatini
Premier League
Premier League
Swaziland